The Grand Canyon Caverns ( or), located just a few miles east of Peach Springs, Arizona, lie  below ground level. They are among the largest dry caverns in the United States. Dry caverns comprise only 3% of caverns in the world. Because of the lack of water, stalagmites and stalactites are rare in the caverns.

During the Mississippian Period, 345 million years ago, the southwestern United States was covered by ocean. Skeletons of sea life settling to the depths, created a mud with a high percentage of calcium. This eventually hardened into the limestone bedrock seen in the caverns today.

Approximately 35 million years ago, rainfall flowed into the rock, and eroded passages that led to the Colorado River and what is now the Grand Canyon. Millions of years later, the evaporating water left calcium deposits on the walls and floors, creating the formations that can be viewed today.

Contemporary history 

In 1927, Walter Peck discovered the caverns by chance. After a failed search for gold, he opened the caverns to travelers and began charging 25 cents admission, which included a view of a purported caveman. In the 1960s the "caveman" was shown to be the remains of two inhabitants of the area, who had died in the winter of 1917–1918. Part of a group of Hualapai Native Americans harvesting and cutting firewood on the caverns' hilltop, they were trapped there for three days by a snowstorm. Two brothers died from influenza, and since the ground was frozen solid with and covered in snow, they were buried in what was thought to be only a  hole, as returning them to their tribal headquarters in Peach Springs risked spreading the flu.

In 1935, the Civilian Conservation Corps and the Works Progress Administration made an agreement with Peck to build a new entrance to the Caverns. In 1962, another entrance was built by blasting a  shaft into the limestone and installing a large elevator. At that time the natural entrance was also sealed off at the request of the Hualapai Indians as it was considered a sacred burial place. Near the natural entrance, the skeletal remains of a Paramylodon harlani (Glossotherium harlani) were also found. This giant and extinct ground sloth lived during the Age of Mammals around 11,000 years ago, when the woolly mammoth and saber tooth cat roamed North America.

Peck had named the caverns Yampai Caverns, with the name being changed several times. Up until 1957, they were known as The Coconino Caverns. From 1957 through 1962, they were known as The Dinosaur Caverns. In 1962, they were renamed The Grand Canyon Caverns.

During the 1962 Cuban Missile Crisis, the U.S. government designated the caverns as a fallout shelter, with supplies for 2,000 people. These supplies remain in the caverns.

Features 

The area includes a hotel, (The Grand Canyon Caverns Inn), an RV park, campgrounds, a restaurant, a convenience store, and a  runway.

Geology 

Limestone comprises the majority of the subsurface area of this vicinity of the Coconino Plateau, an area riddled with numerous cavernous veins that run for miles in all directions.

See also 
 Grand Canyon Caverns Airport
 Historic Route 66

Notes

External links 
 

Caves of Arizona
Civilian Conservation Corps in Arizona
Grand Canyon
Landforms of Coconino County, Arizona
Show caves in the United States
Tourist attractions in Coconino County, Arizona
Works Progress Administration in Arizona